The Eden Project is a visitor attraction in Cornwall, England, UK.

The complex is dominated by two huge enclosures consisting of adjoining domes that house thousands of plant species, and each enclosure emulates a natural biome. The biomes consist of hundreds of hexagonal and pentagonal ethylene tetrafluoroethylene (ETFE) inflated cells supported by geodesic tubular steel domes. The larger of the two biomes simulates a rainforest environment (and is the largest indoor rainforest in the world) and the second, a Mediterranean environment. The attraction also has an outside botanical garden which is home to many plants and wildlife native to Cornwall and the UK in general; it also has many plants that provide an important and interesting backstory, for example, those with a prehistoric heritage.

There are plans to build an Eden Project North in the seaside town of Morecambe, Lancashire, with a focus on the marine environment.

History 

The clay pit in which the project is sited was in use for over 160 years. In 1981, the pit was used by the BBC as the planet surface of Magrathea in the TV series the Hitchhiker's Guide to the Galaxy. By the mid-1990s the pit was all but exhausted.

The initial idea for the project dates back to 1996, with construction beginning in 1998.

The first part of the Eden Project, the visitor centre, opened to the public in May 2000. The first plants began arriving in September of that year, and the full site opened on 17 March 2001.

To counter criticism from environmental groups, the Eden Project committed to investigate a rail link to the site. The rail link was never built, and car parking on the site is still funded from revenue generated from general admission ticket sales.

The Eden Project was used as a filming location for the 2002 James Bond film Die Another Day. On 2 July 2005 The Eden Project hosted the "Africa Calling" concert of the Live 8 concert series. It has also provided some plants for the British Museum's Africa garden.

In 2005, the Project launched "A Time of Gifts" for the winter months, November to February. This features an ice rink covering the lake, with a small café-bar attached, as well as a Christmas market. Cornish choirs regularly perform in the biomes.

In 2007, the Eden Project campaigned unsuccessfully for £50 million in Big Lottery Fund money for a proposed desert biome. It received just 12.07% of the votes, the lowest for the four projects being considered. As part of the campaign, the Eden Project invited people all over Cornwall to try to break the world record for the biggest ever pub quiz as part of its campaign to bring £50 million of lottery funds to Cornwall.

In December 2009, much of the project, including both greenhouses, became available to navigate through Google Street View.

The Eden Trust revealed a trading loss of £1.3 million for 2012–13, on a turnover of £25.4 million. The Eden Project had posted a surplus of £136,000 for the previous year. In 2014 Eden accounts showed a surplus of £2 million.

The World Pasty Championships, an international competition to find the best Cornish pasties and other pasty-type savoury snacks, have been held at the Eden Project since 2012.

The Eden Project is said to have contributed over £1 billion to the Cornish economy. In 2016, Eden became home to Europe's second-largest redwood forest (after the Giants Grove at Birr Castle, Birr Castle, Ireland) when forty saplings of coast redwoods, Sequoia sempervirens, which could live for 4,000 years and reach 115 metres in height, were planted there.

The Eden Project received 1,010,095 visitors in 2019.

In December 2020 the project was closed after heavy rain caused several landslips at the site. Managers at the site are assessing the damage and will announce when the project will reopen on the company's website. Reopening became irrelevant as Covid lockdown measures in the UK indefinitely closed the venue from early 2021, though it had reopened by May 2021 after remedial works had taken place. The site was used for an event during the 2021 G7 Summit, hosted by the United Kingdom.

Design and construction 
The project was conceived by Tim Smit and Jonathan Ball, and designed by Grimshaw Architects and structural engineering firm Anthony Hunt Associates (now part of Sinclair Knight Merz). Davis Langdon carried out the project management, Sir Robert McAlpine and Alfred McAlpine did the construction, MERO jointly designed and built the biome steel structures, the ETFE pillows that build the façade were realized by Vector Foiltec, and Arup was the services engineer, economic consultant, environmental engineer and transportation engineer. Land Use Consultants led the masterplan and landscape design. The project took 2½ years to construct and opened to the public on 17 March 2001.

Site

Layout 

Once into the attraction, there is a meandering path with views of the two biomes, planted landscapes, including vegetable gardens, and sculptures that include a giant bee and previously The WEEE Man (removed in 2016), a towering figure made from old electrical appliances and was meant to represent the average electrical waste used by one person in a lifetime.

Biomes 
At the bottom of the pit are two covered biomes:

It is used for tropical plants, such as fruiting banana plants, coffee, rubber and giant bamboo, and is kept at a tropical temperature and moisture level.

It houses familiar warm temperate and arid plants such as olives and grape vines and various sculptures.

The Outdoor Gardens represent the temperate regions of the world with plants such as tea, lavender, hops, hemp, and sunflowers, as well as local plant species.

The covered biomes are constructed from a tubular steel (hex-tri-hex) with mostly hexagonal external cladding panels made from the thermoplastic ETFE. Glass was avoided due to its weight and potential dangers. The cladding panels themselves are created from several layers of thin UV-transparent ETFE film, which are sealed around their perimeter and inflated to create a large cushion. The resulting cushion acts as a thermal blanket to the structure. The ETFE material is resistant to most stains, which simply wash off in the rain. If required, cleaning can be performed by abseilers. Although the ETFE is susceptible to punctures, these can be easily fixed with ETFE tape. The structure is completely self-supporting, with no internal supports, and takes the form of a geodesic structure.

The ETFE technology was supplied and installed by the firm Vector Foiltec, which is also responsible for ongoing maintenance of the cladding. The steel spaceframe and cladding package (with Vector Foiltec as ETFE subcontractor) was designed, supplied and installed by MERO (UK) PLC, who also jointly developed the overall scheme geometry with the architect, Nicholas Grimshaw & Partners.

The entire build project was managed by McAlpine Joint Venture.

The Core 

The Core is the latest addition to the site and opened in September 2005. It provides the Eden Project with an education facility, incorporating classrooms and exhibition spaces designed to help communicate Eden's central message about the relationship between people and plants. Accordingly, the building has taken its inspiration from plants, most noticeable in the form of the soaring timber roof, which gives the building its distinctive shape.

Grimshaw developed the geometry of the copper-clad roof in collaboration with a sculptor, Peter Randall-Page, and Mike Purvis of structural engineers SKM Anthony Hunts. It is derived from phyllotaxis, which is the mathematical basis for nearly all plant growth; the "opposing spirals" found in many plants such as the seeds in a sunflower's head, pine cones and pineapples. The copper was obtained from traceable sources, and the Eden Project is working with Rio Tinto Group to explore the possibility of encouraging further traceable supply routes for metals, which would enable users to avoid metals mined unethically. The services and acoustic, mechanical, and electrical engineering design was carried out by Buro Happold.

Art at The Core 

The Core is also home to art exhibitions throughout the year. A permanent installation entitled Seed, by Peter Randall-Page, occupies the anteroom.

Environmental aspects 
The biomes provide diverse growing conditions, and many plants are on display.

The Eden Project includes environmental education focusing on the interdependence of plants and people; plants are labelled with their medicinal uses. The massive amounts of water required to create the humid conditions of the Tropical Biome, and to serve the toilet facilities, are all sanitised rain water that would otherwise collect at the bottom of the quarry. The only mains water used is for hand washing and for cooking. The complex also uses Green Tariff Electricity – the energy comes from one of the many wind turbines in Cornwall, which were among the first in Europe.

In December 2010 the Eden Project received permission to build a geothermal electricity plant which will generate approx 4MWe, enough to supply Eden and about 5000 households. The project will involve geothermal heating as well as geothermal electricity. Cornwall Council and the European Union came up with the greater part of £16.8m required to start the project. First a well will be sunk nearly 3 miles (4.5 km) into the granite crust underneath Eden.

Eden co-founder, Sir Tim Smit said, "Since we began, Eden has had a dream that the world should be powered by renewable energy. The sun can provide massive solar power and the wind has been harnessed by humankind for thousands of years, but because both are intermittent and battery technology cannot yet store all we need there is a gap. We believe the answer lies beneath our feet in the heat underground that can be accessed by drilling technology that pumps water towards the centre of the Earth and brings it back up superheated to provide us with heat and electricity".

Drilling began in May 2021, and it was expected the project would be completed by 2023.

Other projects

Eden Project North
In 2018, the Eden Project revealed its design for a new version of the project, located on the seafront in Morecambe, Lancashire. There will be biomes shaped like mussels and a focus on the marine environment. There will also be reimagined lidos, gardens, performance spaces, immersive experiences and observatories.

Grimshaw are the architects for the project, which is expected to cost £80 million. The project is a partnership with the Lancashire Enterprise Partnership, Lancaster University, Lancashire County Council and Lancaster City Council. In December 2018, the four local partners agreed to provide £1 million to develop the idea, which allowed the development of an outline planning application for the project. It is expected that there will be 500 jobs created and 8,000 visitors a day to the site. 

Having been granted planning permission in January 2022 and with £50 million of levelling-up funding granted in January 2023, it is due to open in 2024 and predicted to benefit the North West economy by £200 million per year.

Dundee
In May 2021, it was announced that the Eden Project had chosen the site of the former gasworks in Dundee as the location where it hoped to establish its first attraction in Scotland. It was planned that the new development would result in 200 new jobs and "contribute £27m a year to the regional economy".

South Downs
In 2020, Eastbourne Borough Council and the Eden Project announced a joint project to explore the viability of a new Eden site in the South Downs National Park.

Qingdao, China
In 2015, the Eden Project announced that it had reached an agreement to construct an Eden site in Qingdao, China. While the site had originally been slated to open by 2020, construction fell behind schedule due to the COVID-19 pandemic and the opening date was delayed to 2023. The new site is expected to focus on "water" and its central role in civilization and nature.

Eden Sessions 
Since 2002, the Project has hosted a series of musical performances, called the Eden Sessions, usually held during the summer. 

The 2022 sessions, which were mostly made up of the rescheduled 2020 sessions that was postponed due to the COVID-19 pandemic and the temporary closing of the Eden Project, was headlined by original 2020 lineup acts Diana Ross, Nine Inch Nails, Bryan Adams and My Chemical Romance, with the latter returning to touring after a six-year hiatus, along with Noel Gallagher’s High Flying Birds and Stereophonics, who were both later added to the 2022 lineup. Lionel Richie, who was apart of the rescheduled 2020 lineup, would announce that his show was cancelled before the 2022 sessions began.

Lineup history

In the media 
The Eden Project has appeared in various television shows and films such as the James Bond film Die Another Day, The Bad Education Movie, in the Netflix series The Last Bus and in the Cbeebies show Andy's Aquatic Adventure.

A weekly radio show called The Eden Radio Project is held every Thursday afternoon on Radio St Austell Bay.

On 18 November 2019, on the Trees A Crowd podcast, David Oakes would interview the Eden Project's Head of Interpretation, Dr Jo Elworthy, about the site.

See also 

 BIOS-3
 Biosphere 2
 Closed ecological system
 IBTS Greenhouse
 Montreal Biodome
 Montreal Biosphère
 Mitchell Park Horticultural Conservatory ("The Domes" of Milwaukee)
 Ecosystem
 Vivarium
 The Lost Gardens of Heligan
 List of topics related to Cornwall
 Earthpark
 Sir Richard Carew Pole
 Thin-shell structure
 List of thin shell structures

References

Further reading 
 Philip McMillan Browse, Louise Frost, Alistair Griffiths: Plants of Eden (Eden Project). Penzance 2001: Alison Hodge.
 Richard Mabey: Fencing Paradise: Exploring the Gardens of Eden London 2005: Eden Project Books. 
 Hugh Pearman, Andrew Whalley: The Architecture of Eden. With a foreword by Sir Nicholas Grimshaw. London 2003: Eden Project Books. 
 Eden Team (Ed.): Eden Project: The Guide 2008/9. London 2008: Eden Project Books.
 Tim Smit: Eden. London 2001: Bantam Press.
 Paul Spooner: The Revenge of the Green Planet: The Eden Project Book of Amazing Facts About Plants. London 2003: Eden Project Books.
 Alan Titchmarsh: The Eden Project. United Kingdom: Acorn Media, 2006. .

External links 

 
 Eden Sessions Website—Official site for live gigs

Buildings and structures completed in 2000
Nicholas Grimshaw buildings
High-tech architecture
Botanical gardens in Cornwall
Building engineering
Buildings and structures in Cornwall
Ecological experiments
Environmental design
Geodesic domes
Greenhouses in the United Kingdom
Tourist attractions in Cornwall
2000 establishments in England
St Blazey